The Karścino Wind Farm is a 90-megawatt wind farm located in the West Pomeranian Voivodeship of Poland.

Description
The first phase consisted of 46 turbines, the second phase of 9 turbines, the third one of 5 turbines (60 turbines total). All the turbines are of the same type, Fuhrländer FL MD77, 1.5 MW each, so the total capacity is 90 MW.

The wind farm entered service in 2009.

It is located near the villages of Karścino, Mołtowo and Krukowo in Białogard County and Kołobrzeg County. According to the current operator, the area of the wind farm is 11 km2.

According to the operator, the wind farm generates about 170 gigawatt-hours of energy per year, at a 21.6% capacity factor.

Ownership

The wind farm was owned by the Spanish company Iberdrola, but on February 26, 2013 it was sold to the Polish company Energa. The transaction also included the Bystra wind farm in the Pomeranian Voivodeship and a "package of projects". Simultaneously, another Polish company Polska Grupa Energetyczna purchased other existing wind farms and projects from Iberdrola. The combined worth of both transactions was estimated at 1.1 billion PLN.

References

Wind farms in Poland
Białogard County